The 1977–78 OMJHL season was the fourth season of the Ontario Major Junior Hockey League (OMJHL). The Fincups franchise moved back from St. Catharines to Hamilton after a temporary year away from the city due to lack of a suitable arena. The league featured a wealth of scoring talent during the season, with two players recording the league's highest single season point totals. Third season veteran Bobby Smith, edged 17-year-old rookie Wayne Gretzky for the Eddie Powers Memorial Trophy, scoring 192 points. Twelve teams each played 68 games. The Peterborough Petes won the J. Ross Robertson Cup, defeating the Hamilton Fincups.

League business

Hosting duties for the Memorial Cup rotated among the three constituent leagues of the Canadian Major Junior Hockey League CMJHL), since its founding in 1975. OMJHL commissioner Tubby Schmalz announced that two Northern Ontario cities were chosen by the OMJHL to co-host the 1978 Memorial Cup in Sudbury and Sault Ste. Marie.

In February 1978, Iona Campagnolo, the Minister of State of Fitness and Amateur Sport released a report which claimed that junior hockey functioned in the best interests of professional hockey instead of the players. Schmalz said that the CMJHL would welcome a study into its player development programs, if given a say on selecting the inquiry members. He stated an inquiry would reveal that the CMJHL was doing its best for the welfare of the players. He highlighted its academic standards, and stated that the OMJHL fined players who missed classes, suspended players who did not keep up with the workload.

The CMJHL expressed frustration with the 1978 WHA Amateur Draft being held during the junior season and four months earlier than the 1978 NHL Amateur Draft. The league was concerned that its players would be pursued for professional contracts while playing junior hockey, despite the names of drafted players not being released. The league considered having the Canadian Amateur Hockey Association use its International Ice Hockey Federation membership as leverage to block World Hockey Association (WHA) exhibition games against international teams and force the WHA to negotiate. In May 1978, Schmalz stated that the continued signing of junior-aged players by the WHA would mean forfeiture of a $150,000 bond paid as a promise not to sign players before November.

Regular season

Standings

Scoring leaders

Playoffs

First round
Kitchener Rangers defeat Toronto Marlboros 3–2

Sault Ste. Marie Greyhounds defeat Kingston Canadians 3–2

Hamilton Fincups defeat Windsor Spitfires 4–1, 1 tie

Peterborough Petes defeat Oshawa Generals 4–1, 1 tie

Quarterfinals
Ottawa 67's defeat Sault Ste. Marie Greyhounds 4–3, 1 tie

London Knights defeat Kitchener Rangers 4–0

Semifinals
Hamilton Fincups defeat London Knights 4–2, 1 tie

Peterborough Petes defeat Ottawa 67's 4–3, 1 tie

J. Ross Robertson Cup
Peterborough Petes defeat Hamilton Fincups 4–3, 1 tie

Awards

See also
List of OHA Junior A standings
List of OHL seasons
1978 Memorial Cup
1978 NHL Entry Draft
1977 in sports
1978 in sports

References

External links
HockeyDB

Ontario Hockey League seasons
OMJHL